Color Line AS is the largest cruiseferry line operating on routes to and from Norway.  The company is also one of the leading operators in Europe. Color Line provides transportation for people and cargo, hotel accommodation, shopping, restaurants and entertainment. The company currently employs 3500 people in four countries.

Color Line's main office is in Oslo, but the company also has Norwegian offices in Kristiansand, Sandefjord and Larvik, in addition to international offices in Kiel, Hirtshals and Strömstad.

History 

Color Line has roots in the ferry business that go back more than 100 years. The company was established in 1990 when two Norwegian shipping companies, Jahre Line and Norway Line merged. Jahre Line had operated ferries between Oslo and Kiel since 1961, while Norway Line had operated ferries from Norway to the United Kingdom and the Netherlands since 1986. During 1990 Color Line also took over the Fred. Olsen Lines cruiseferry operations, thereby expanding the traffic area of the new company to Norway–Denmark routes.

During the first half of the 1990s Color Line expanded its tonnage by lengthening its existing ships or by acquisition of larger second-hand ships. The company began operating fast ferries between Norway and Denmark during the summer of 1996. Initially the operations were in collaboration with SeaContainers, but were run without them from 1997 onwards. In October of the same year Color Line took over the operations of Larvik Line, its competitor in the Norway—Denmark traffic. In September 1998 Color Line acquired both the Color Hotel Skagen and Scandi Line, which operated two ferries on the short routes connecting Norway and Sweden. In the end of 1998 the Norway–United Kingdom operations were sold to Fjord Line. For the 1999 summer season the (former) Scandi Line ships received new Color Scandi Line liveries. They were fully incorporated into the Color Line fleet in 2001.

In April 2008 the company announced the closure of the Oslo—Hirtshals service from 6 May 2008 onwards.

In January 2017, Color Line announced that it had signed a letter of intent with the Ulstein Verft shipyard to build a new ferry with a hybrid drivetrain for the Sandefjord–Strömstad route, with delivery expected in 2019. The keel was laid in April 2018 in Poland and the ship was launched in November 2018.

In November 2022, Color Line announed thar Color Carrier and Color Viking will end operations.

Ships and routes

Former ships

References

External links 

 Color Line official website

 
Ferry companies of Agder
Ferry companies of Oslo
Ferry companies of Vestfold og Telemark